Hydas, also known as Hyda (Ὑδά), was an inland town of ancient Caria, mentioned by Pliny the Elder. 
 
Its site is located near Selimiye, Asiatic Turkey.

References

Populated places in ancient Caria
Former populated places in Turkey
History of Muğla Province
Marmaris District